Erythrobacter litoralis is a species of bacterium. E. litoralis strain HTCC2594 was first sequenced in 2009. Erythrobacter litoralis strain DSM 8509 was developed as a comparative genetic model system to investigate the role of visible light in regulation of the general stress response in Alphaproteobacteria. The complete genome sequence of E. litoralis DSM 8509 has been published.

Description
It is an obligately aerobic, bacteriochlorophyll a-containing bacterium.

References

External links
LPSN 
Type strain of Erythrobacter litoralis at BacDive -  the Bacterial Diversity Metadatabase

Sphingomonadales
Bacteria described in 1994